Horlești is a commune in Iași County, Western Moldavia, Romania. It is composed of three villages: Bogdănești, Horlești and Scoposeni.

At the 2002 census, 100% of inhabitants were ethnic Romanians. 60.4% were Romanian Orthodox, 39% Roman Catholic and 0.6% Seventh-day Adventist.

References

Communes in Iași County
Localities in Western Moldavia